Koen Brack (born 13 October 1981 in the Netherlands) is a Dutch footballer.

References

Dutch footballers
Association football defenders
Living people
1981 births
Go Ahead Eagles players
SC Cambuur players
SK Austria Kärnten players